A wildflower is a flower that grows wild.

Wildflower(s) or Wild Flower(s) may also refer to:

Film, television, and theater
 Wildflower (1914 film), an American drama directed by Allan Dwan
 Wildflower (1991 film), an American television film directed by Diane Keaton
 Wildflower: The Legendary California Triathlon, a documentary film about the Wildflower Triathlon (see below)
 Wildflowers (film), a 1999 American film directed by Melissa Painter
 Wild Flower (film), a 1943 Mexican film directed by Emilio Fernández
 Wild Flowers (1930 film), a Chinese film of the 1930s
 Wild Flowers (1982 film), a Canadian film directed by Jean Pierre Lefebvre
 Wild Flowers (2000 film), a Czech film directed by F. A. Brabec
 Wild Flowers (2015 film), a South Korean film directed by Park Suk-young
 Wild Flowers (2022 film), a Spanish-French film
 Wildflower (2022 film), a Canadian film
 Wildflower Film Awards, South Korea
 Wildflower (TV series), a 2017 Philippine drama series
 Wildflower (musical), a 1923 Broadway musical

Music

Performers and events
 Wildflower (band), an Australian Aboriginal rock/reggae band
 The Wild Flowers, a 1983–1997 British post-punk group
 The Wilde Flowers, a 1960s English psychedelic rock band
 Wildflower! Arts and Music Festival, an annual event in Richardson, Texas, US

Albums
 Wildflower (The Avalanches album) or the title song, 2016
 Wildflower (Hank Crawford album), 1973
 Wildflower (Lauren Alaina album), 2011
 Wildflower (Sandy Lam album), 1991
 Wildflower (Sheryl Crow album) or the title song, 2005
 Wildflowers (Cassandra Vasik album) or the title song (see below), 1991
 Wildflowers (Jess & Matt album), 2021
 Wildflowers (Jonathan Byrd album) or the title song, 2001
 Wildflowers (Judy Collins album), 1967
 Wildflowers (Tom Petty album) or the title song (see below), 1994
 Wildflowers: The New York Loft Jazz Sessions, an album series with performances by various artists, 1977
 Wild Flower (Houston Person album), 1978
 Wild Flower (Hubert Laws album) or the title song, 1972
 Wildflower, by Nessly, 2018
 Wildflowers, by Connie Price and the Keystones, 2004

Songs
 "Wildflower" (5 Seconds of Summer song), 2020
 "Wildflower" (Dean Brody song), 2010
 "Wildflower" (the JaneDear girls song), 2010
 "Wildflower" (Skylark song), 1973; covered by Hank Crawford (1973), Gary Morris (1986), and many others
 "Wildflower" (Superfly song), 2010
 "Wildflowers" (Cassandra Vasik song), 1992
 "Wildflowers" (Dolly Parton song), 1988
 "Wildflowers" (Tom Petty song), 1994
 "Wild Flowers" (Things of Stone and Wood song), 1994
 "Wildflower", by Beach House from Depression Cherry, 2015
 "Wildflower", by Bon Jovi from Have a Nice Day, 2005
 "Wildflower", by Cee Lo Green from  The Lady Killer, 2010
 "Wildflower", by Kasey Chambers from Rattlin' Bones, 2008
 "Wildflowers", by Bradley Joseph from One Deep Breath, 2002
 "Wild Flower", by the Cult from Electric, 1987
 "Wild Flower", by Wayne Shorter from Speak No Evil, 1966
 "Wild Flowers", by Doctor and the Medics from I Keep Thinking It's Tuesday, 1987
 "Wild Flowers", by Ryan Adams from Gold, 2001
 "Wild Flower", by RM of BTS (with Youjeen of Cherry Filter) from Indigo, 2022

Other uses
 Wildflower, California, US, an unincorporated community
 Wildflower Creek, a stream in Missouri, US
 Wildflower Triathlon, an annual triathlon at Lake San Antonio, California, US
 The Wildflowers series, a series of short novels by Andrew Neiderman writing as V. C. Andrews
 Wild Flowers: An Aid to Knowledge of our Wild Flowers and their Insect Visitors or Nature's Garden, a 1900 book by Neltje Blanchan
 Wild Flower, a fictional character in the 2005 video game Jade Empire

See also
 Wildflower Festival (disambiguation)
 Wildflower Preserve (disambiguation)